was a Japanese football player. He played for Japan national team.

Club career
Shimizu was born on September 30, 1902. After graduating from Tokyo Aoyama Normal School, he played for Tokyo Shukyu-Dan was founded by his alma mater school graduates.

National team career
In May 1923, Shimizu was selected Japan national team for 1923 Far Eastern Championship Games in Osaka. At this competition, on May 23, he debuted against Philippines and scored a goal in the 5th minute. However, Japan was lost at the end. This match is Japan team first match in International A Match and this goal is Japan team first goal in International A Match. Next day, he also played against Republic of China. But Japan lost in both matches (1-2, v Philippines and 1-5, v Republic of China). He played 2 games and scored 1 goal for Japan in 1923.

National team statistics

References

External links
 
 Japan National Football Team Database

1902 births
Year of death missing
Tokyo Gakugei University alumni
Japanese footballers
Japan international footballers
Association football forwards